Bangladesh-China Renewable Energy Company (Pvt.) Limited is a joint venture company between Bangladesh and China. It is owned by Northwest Power Generation Company, owned by the government of Bangladesh, and China National Machinery Import and Export Corporation, a subsidiary of the Chinese state-owned China General Technology Group. A. M. Khurshedul Alam is the managing director of the company. 

The Bangladesh-China Renewable Energy Company (Pvt.) Limited is a part of China's Belt and Road Initiative.

History 
Bangladesh-China Renewable Energy Company (Pvt.) Limited was established on 1 September 2020 as a joint venture company between Northwest Power Generation Company, owned by the government of Bangladesh, and China National Machinery Import and Export Corporation, a Chinese state-owned China General Technology Group subsidiary. From 1 September 2020 to 25 January 2021, Dr. Sultan Ahmed was the chairman of Bangladesh-China Renewable Energy Company (Pvt.) Limited. Md. Habibur Rahman was appointed chairman to replace him. 

Bangladesh-China Renewable Energy Company (Pvt.) Limited will build a solar powerplant on land leased by North-West Power Generation Company Limited from Bangladesh Bridge Authority near Bangabandhu Jamuna Multipurpose Bridge. It will be a 60 megawatt powerplant. The company is building a 50 megawatt wind powerplant at Payra, Patuakhali District. It is building a 60 megawatt solar powerplant in Pabna. The administration of Pabna District allocated land for the project which was claimed by locals who live in there. It is implementing another solar powerplant titled Jamuna 125 megawatt.

Board of directors

References 

Organisations based in Dhaka
Government-owned companies of Bangladesh

2020 establishments in Bangladesh
Energy companies established in 2020